Six Mile is an unincorporated community in Morgan County, Alabama, United States. It is served by the zip code for the nearby town of Somerville.

References

Unincorporated communities in Morgan County, Alabama
Unincorporated communities in Alabama